Florence Pétry-Amiel (born 29 September 1942, at Soustons, country), is a  former French athlete who specialized in the High Jump.

Biography  
Florence-Petry Amiel was ninth in the High Jump competition at the 1960 Summer Olympics at Rome.

Notes and references

External links  
 Olympic profile for Florence Pétry-Amiel on sports-reference.com

1942 births
Living people
French female high jumpers
Athletes (track and field) at the 1960 Summer Olympics
Olympic athletes of France